César Augusto Valoyes Córdoba (born January 5, 1984) is a Colombian footballer who plays as a striker for Peruvian side Juan Aurich.

He is known as an agile and fast forward. His great speed became his best argument to face the rival defenses, player of the great mobility, with both power and speed in short passages.

International career
He also played in several games for the Colombia national football team.

He played for Colombia in Copa América 2007.

Honours
Independiente Medellín
Categoría Primera A: 2004-I, 2009-II

Notes

References

1984 births
Living people
Colombian footballers
Association football forwards
Colombia international footballers
2005 CONCACAF Gold Cup players
2007 Copa América players
Categoría Primera A players
Independiente Medellín footballers
Independiente Santa Fe footballers
C.D. Veracruz footballers
Wuhan F.C. players
China League One players
Real Cartagena footballers
Atlético Huila footballers
Universidad Técnica de Cajamarca footballers
Juan Aurich footballers
Colombian expatriate footballers
Expatriate footballers in Mexico
Expatriate footballers in China
Expatriate footballers in Peru
Sportspeople from Chocó Department